Thomas Partridge Clish (born 19 October 1932) is an English former footballer who made 52 appearances in the Football League playing as a goalkeeper for Darlington. He was also on the books of West Ham United, without playing for them in the League.

References

1932 births
Living people
People from Wheatley Hill
Footballers from County Durham
English footballers
Association football goalkeepers
West Ham United F.C. players
Darlington F.C. players
English Football League players